Proaegeria is a genus of moths in the family Sesiidae containing only one species, Proaegeria vouauxi, which is known from Cameroon.

References

Endemic fauna of Cameroon
Sesiidae
Insects of Cameroon
Moths of Africa